RUSD may refer to;

United States school districts
 Racine Unified School District, in Racine County, Wisconsin.
 Ramona Unified School District, in San Diego County, California.
 Redlands Unified School District, in San Bernardino County, California.
 Reed Union School District, in Marin County, California.
 Rialto Unified School District, in San Bernardino County, California.
 Riverside Unified School District, in Riverside County, California.
 Rocklin Unified School District, in Placer County, California.
 Rowland Unified School District, in Los Angeles County, California.

Other
 RUSD Investment Bank, based in Malaysia (see List of banks in Malaysia).